Student Action For Refugees (STAR) is the national network of students building a more understanding and just society where refugees are welcomed as equals in the UK. Its student groups based in colleges and universities and its central team of experts, work together at number of levels to bring about lasting change:

 volunteering locally working directly with refugees, building understanding and cultural connections
 campaigning nationally securing policy change and equal access to higher education for refugees
 learning about issues facing refugees and the asylum journey in the UK with experts and peers

The organisation has close ties with several other refugee agencies such as the Refugee Council, Refugee Action and UNHCR.

History
In 1992, students at the University of Nottingham were inspired by the idea of a society that welcomed refugees – so they decided to create one. Andy Davies (then a politics student, now Channel 4 home affairs correspondent) approached the UN High Commissioner for Refugees in Geneva, pitching the idea of a network of student societies aimed at supporting refugees.

Andy was asked to set up a pilot scheme, and in 1994, the first STAR group was set up, with support from UNHCR and the British Refugee Council. Then-social policy student Elly Hargreave became a co-founder of STAR, growing the movement with groups in London and Edinburgh established by 1996. 

Elly went on to found STAR as a registered charity in 1999 to support a national network of students campaigning, volunteering, and learning together. In 2008, the launch of STAR's Equal Access campaign marked the start of its work improving pathways into higher education for refugees.

STAR Network

The STAR network now consists of more than 50 university groups (usually as a society in the Students' Union). The groups are supported by the national office which provides various resources, training and organisation. Each year STAR organises a national Conference in the Autumn Term, an Annual Action Day in Spring and a Summer training weekend. These events are for all young people interested in finding out more about refugee issues.

References

External links
STAR National Website

Organisations based in the London Borough of Islington
Student organisations in the United Kingdom
Youth charities based in the United Kingdom
Development charities based in the United Kingdom